Franklin Historic District is a national historic district located at Franklin, Pendleton County, West Virginia. The district encompasses 111 contributing buildings, mostly residences. It also includes the central business district, much of it rebuilt after a fire in 1924.  Most of the residences are in the Queen Anne or American Foursquare style, with commercial Greek Revival and Italianate-style buildings.  Notable buildings include an early 19th-century, stuccoed stone farmhouse and barn, five Queen Anne style dwellings (c. 1890, c. 1900), and the Pendleton County Court House (1924-1925). Also located in the district is the separately listed McCoy House.

It was listed on the National Register of Historic Places in 1986.

References

External links

Houses on the National Register of Historic Places in West Virginia
Historic districts on the National Register of Historic Places in West Virginia
Houses in Pendleton County, West Virginia
National Register of Historic Places in Pendleton County, West Virginia
Greek Revival architecture in West Virginia
Queen Anne architecture in West Virginia
Italianate architecture in West Virginia
American Foursquare architecture in West Virginia
Historic districts in Pendleton County, West Virginia